BMP Global Distribution Inc v Bank of Nova Scotia, is a significant case of the Supreme Court of Canada on the law of restitution and tracing, in this case dealing with a bank's right to recover funds paid by mistake on the deposit of a fraudulent cheque.

The facts

BMP, a company that distributed non-stick bakeware, entered into an agreement with a third party for selling the rights to distribute such goods in the United States. Subsequently, it received an unendorsed cheque of $904,563 payable to BMP.  The cheque was drawn on the account of a company at the Royal Bank of Canada ("RBC").  Neither this company nor the name of the sender of the envelope containing the cheque was known to BMP,  or was apparently linked to the business purchasing the right to distribute the bakeware. BMP banked with the Bank of Nova Scotia ("BNS"), and arranged to deposit the cheque into its account there.

After the cheque had cleared and the funds were subsequently released to BMP, several transfers took place over the following ten days to other accounts at BNS held by BMP's principals and a related company. RBC subsequently notified BNS that the cheque for $904,563 was counterfeit, as the drawer's signatures were forged and asked for BNS's assistance.  BNS interrupted all transactions in BMP's account and in all related accounts and asked BMP for assistance in recovering the proceeds of the forged cheque.  BMP insisted on retaining the amount it still held.

BNS then restrained the funds in accounts under its control that it linked to the forged cheque.  RBC and BNS entered into an agreement by which BNS was, at RBC's request, to transfer the restrained funds to RBC and RBC was to indemnify BNS for any losses related to the restraint and transfer.  BNS transferred $777,336 to RBC.

The courts below

In the original case before the British Columbia Supreme Court, the trial judge ordered BNS to pay $777,336 in total pecuniary damages and also awarded damages for wrongful disclosure of information and defamation. In his view, BNS had violated the service agreement as well as the law applicable to banker/customer relations by charging back amounts credited to BMP's and the related accounts.

On appeal to the British Columbia Court of Appeal, BNS's appeal was allowed against BMP by reducing the latter's damages to $101.  As to the funds traced in the related accounts, the court found that BMP's transfers were proper and that the cheques were actual bills of exchange and dismissed the appeals against BMP's related parties.

Appeal to the Supreme Court

In a unanimous judgment, BMP's appeal was dismissed, and BNS' cross-appeal was allowed.

The right to recover funds

As noted in Barclays Bank v. Simms, if a person pays money to another under a mistake of fact which causes him to make the payment, he or she is prima facie entitled to recover it.  The person's claim may fail, however, if:

 the payor intends that the payee shall have the money at all events or is deemed in law so to intend (the principle of "finality of payment");
 the payment is made for good consideration; or
 the payee has changed his position in good faith or is deemed in law to have done so.

In that regard, BMP had raised the following points in its defence:

 on finality of payment:
 it forms part of the common law and that it prevents the drawee bank from recovering the paid proceeds of a forged cheque from anyone other than the forger
 the scheme of the Bills of Exchange Act does not allow RBC to recover from BNS or BMP
 the service agreement between BNS and BMP precludes BNS from recovering such proceeds from BMP
 on good consideration:
 RBC should bear the loss
 on the payee's (i.e., BNS) change of position:
 BNS's role was changed from that of a collecting bank to that of a borrower

Here, RBC had a right to recover the money paid to BMP.  RBC's payment was made on the basis of a forged cheque and the defences are not available to BMP in the circumstances of this case.

The principles of tracing

BNS had the right to claim the amount in BMP's account and to trace funds in the related accounts.  There is no issue of identification of the money in BMP's account.

It is possible at common law to trace funds into bank accounts if it is possible to identify the funds.  When the chain is broken by one of the intervening parties paying from its own funds, identification of the claimant's funds is no longer possible. However, the fact that a cheque passes through a clearing system, or that it may have been certified, does not break the chain, as the funds have not lost their identity. Tracing is impossible only when the means of ascertainment fail. As noted by the Court,

Aftermath

The decision has given Canadian financial institutions some protection in the event of the deposit of counterfeit cheques. The Court, however, in Canada Trustco Mortgage Co. v. Canada, decided not to extend its principles to other types of fraudulent payments, although the dissenting opinion in that case endorsed the approach.

References

External links

Supreme Court of Canada cases
2009 in Canadian case law
Scotiabank